|}

This is a list of House of Assembly results for the 1950 South Australian state election.

Results by electoral district

Adelaide

Albert

Alexandra

Angas

Burnside

Burra

Chaffey

Eyre

Flinders

Frome

Gawler

Glenelg

Goodwood

Gouger

Gumeracha

Hindmarsh

Light

Mitcham

Mount Gambier

Murray

Newcastle

Norwood 

 Two party preferred vote was estimated.

Onkaparinga

Port Adelaide

Port Pirie 

 Preferences were not distributed.

Prospect 

 Two party preferred vote was estimated.

Ridley

Rocky River

Semaphore

Stanley

Stirling

Stuart

Thebarton

Torrens

Unley

Victoria

Wallaroo 

 Two party preferred vote was estimated.

Yorke Peninsula

Young

See also
Candidates of the 1950 South Australian state election
Members of the South Australian House of Assembly, 1950–1953

References

1950
1950 elections in Australia
1950s in South Australia